Miss Dance of Great Britain is a stage dance competition for girls, which is held annually in the United Kingdom.

Overview
Miss Dance of Great Britain is a long running theatre dance competition for girls, established and organised by the International Dance Teachers Association. The national finals are held annually at the Winter Gardens in Blackpool, England.  The finals also include the judging of the boys competition, Dance Master UK, and the International Ballet Championships.

Qualifying
Entrants who wish to compete in the national finals of Miss Dance, must first qualify for the competition by winning a regional heat.  Heats are held at dance festivals nationwide throughout the year.  The majority of these festivals are independently run and must apply to the IDTA in order to stage a heat of Miss Dance.

To enter a regional heat, competitors must be aged 16 years or over on 31 May in the year of competition and must be amateur dancers or be in full-time training.  Professional dancers are not permitted to enter.

In the heats, each competitor performs a three-minute solo dance in a modern theatre or cabaret style.  This may include jazz, tap, song, dialogue, instrumentation or comedy, with dance as the dominant discipline.  Classical Ballet, character dance or national dance styles are not permitted.  The IDTA requests that competitors present a solo that has been specially choreographed for the competition.  Should a competitor win their regional heat, they must perform the same solo, without changes, at the national final.

To qualify for the national finals, a competitor must win their heat with a score of 85 marks or more, and they then represent that festival at the finals.  A runner-up place is also awarded and the runner-up may compete at the national finals if they have scored a qualifying mark and only if the heat winner is unable to compete.  It is very common for dancers to compete in numerous regional heats throughout the country in order to qualify for the national finals.

The Finals
The national finals of Miss Dance are organised by the IDTA and are held annually at the Winter Gardens in Blackpool.  During the finals, the competitors compete in a series of dance-offs, judged by a panel of specialist adjudicators.  This narrows down the number of competitors to a selection of finalists, who then perform again for the judges in the grand final and the winner of the Miss Dance title is awarded.

The winner of Miss Dance of Great Britain receives a trophy and a cash prize, with trophies also being awarded for the runner-up and 3rd places.  The winner is given the title of Miss Dance of Great Britain, until a new winner is chosen the following year.

Being a prestigious competition, the winner of Miss Dance will normally enjoy a number of other benefits including dancing at various IDTA seminars and events, and being invited to perform at the IDTA's annual showcase gala at a major UK theatre.

Because it is such a prestigious title the previous winners of miss dance's names will all be published in the most recent programmes. Their names will ascend chronologically.

Grand Final Winners

2022
Winner - Scarlett O’Connor  of Shine Theatre Arts
Runner Up - Olivia Moore of McLaren Dance Company
3rd Place -  Sorcha Stephenson  of Nadines Dance Company

2019
Winner - Grace Hawksworth  of Victoria Stansfield School of Dance 
Runner Up - Lauren Wood of Wirral Theatre School
3rd Place -  Lucy Holcroft  of Berry Academy of Dance

2018

Winner - Leah Darby  of Adele Taylor School of Dance 
Runner Up - Megan Dury  of  Tabs Studios Performing Arts Company 
3rd Place -  Ellie Burke  of Jeanette McCulloch School of Dance

2017
Winner - Abbie Platts  of Nadines Dance Company
Runner Up - Ame Marie Barnett  of  Tabs Studios Performing Arts Company 
3rd Place -  Bree Quinton  of  Berry Academy of Dance

2016 
Winner -  Harriet Fisher of Strickland Cook Dance School
Runner Up- Eloise Gledhill of Adele Taylor School of Dance
3rd Place - Ciara Farrelly of Marion Sweeney School of Dance

2015
Winner - Demi Leigh Foster of Nadines Dance Company
Runner Up- Eloise Gledhill of Adele Taylor School of Dance
3rd Place - Maddie Lawton of Adele Taylor School of Dance

2014
Winner - Hollie-Jane Woodhouse of Betty Chappelle Dance Centre
Runner Up - Ebony Kitts of Hazelbiz Performers Academy3rd Place - Francesca Thompson  of The Gwyneth Hare School of Dancing2013
Winner - Amelia- Rose Fielding of Adele Taylor School of DanceRunner Up- Olivia Roach of Riley School of Dance3rd Place- Chloe Murray of Armley Dance Studios2012
Winner - Lucie Horsfall of Adele Taylor School of DanceRunner Up- Chloe Murray of Armley Dance Studios3rd Place- Amelia Rose Fielding of Adele Taylor School of Dance2011
Winner - Bethany Whittle of Elaine Milbourne Performing Arts SchoolRunner Up - Courtney George of Georgie School of Theatre Arts3rd Place - Amy Bryson Smith of the Riley School of Dance2010
Winner - Yasmin Harrison of Phil Winston's Theatre WorksRunner Up - Stephanie Thompson of the Hazel Bell School of Dance and Phil Winston's Theatre Works3rd Place - Samantha Carson of the Riley School of Dance2009
Winner - Sophie Turner of the Riley School of DanceRunner Up - Stephanie Thompson of the Hazel Bell School of Dance3rd Place - Amy Bryson Smith of the Riley School of Dance2008
Winner - Kirby Campbell of the Suzanne Stuart School of DanceRunner Up - Rachael McMahon of the Suzanne Stuart School of Dance3rd Place - Samantha Carson of the Riley School of Dance2007
Winner - Alexandra Fern of the Riley School of DanceRunner Up - Rachael McMahon of the Suzanne Stuart School of Dance3rd Place - Cherry Muir of the Val Armstrong Academy of Performing Arts2006
Winner - Holly Brierley of the Robinson Read School of Dance2005
Winner - Lorna Sales of  Jean Geddess School of Dance2004
Winner - Alicia Peacock of the Elizabeth Hill School Of Dance and Drama2003
Winner - Leanne Marshbank of Riley School of Dance''

Sources
Miss Dance of Great Britain - 2008 Winner

External links
International Dance Teachers Association
Miss Dance of Great Britain

Dance awards
Competitions in the United Kingdom
Annual events in the United Kingdom
British performing arts awards